Pace Yourself is an album by saxophonist Tim Berne's Caos Totale which was recorded in 1990 and released on the JMT label.

Reception
The AllMusic review by Brian Olewnick states "Pace Yourself finds Berne's Caos Totale sextet exploring his rich, multi-layered compositions in depth and at length. Berne's pieces, especially his longer, episodic ones, tend to take unexpected twists and turns; you'll find very little of the traditional "head-solos-head" song structure here. Though most of his themes have a blues base, they emerge and disappear in conformity with their own logic, not a pre-existing formula".

Track listing
All compositions by Tim Berne
 "Bass Voodoo" - 9:57
 "The Noose" - 7:36   
 "The Usual" - 8:18   
 "Sam's Dilemma" - 13:36
 "The Legend of P-1" - 26:24   
 "Luna" - 4:31

Personnel
Tim Berne - alto saxophone
Herb Robertson - trumpet, cornet,  flutes, flugelhorn, balloon, whistles, vocals
Steve Swell - trombone
Marc Ducret - electric guitar, fretless electric guitar
Mark Dresser - bass, bungy giffus
Bobby Previte - drums, music manuscript

References 

1991 albums
Tim Berne albums
JMT Records albums
Winter & Winter Records albums